Sanat Misra  also spelt Mishra (1962 – 17 June 2006) was an Indian badminton player. He was the national doubles champion and mixed doubles champion. He was the bronze medalist in badminton at the 1986 Asian Games in the Men's team event.

References

1962 deaths
2006 deaths
People from Cuttack
Racket sportspeople from Odisha
Indian male badminton players
Indian national badminton champions
Asian Games medalists in badminton
Medalists at the 1986 Asian Games
Asian Games bronze medalists for India
Badminton players at the 1986 Asian Games